Linda Moore (born February 24, 1954 in Vancouver, British Columbia as Linda J. Tweedie) is a Canadian world champion curler. From 1989 until 2014, she was a member of the TSN curling coverage team along with Vic Rauter and formerly Ray Turnbull (replaced by Russ Howard in 2010).

Career
While working as a schoolteacher, Moore skipped the British Columbia team to the 1985 Scott Tournament of Hearts championship and went on to win the world championship that year. As skip of the defending champion Team Canada, she lost in the finals of the 1986 Scott Tournament of Hearts to Marilyn Darte after going 10-1 through the roundrobin. Moore was selected as skip on the tournament's all-star team.

Moore's rink defeated Connie Laliberte in the finals of the Canadian Olympic trials in 1987 and she skipped the Canadian team that finished first at the demonstration event at the 1988 Winter Olympics in Calgary.

In 1989, she succeeded Vera Pezer as a member of TSN's curling broadcast team. She also served as executive director of Curl BC for 19 years. On December 1, 2014, TSN announced that Moore had retired from broadcasting, citing an unspecified chronic health condition.

See also
 Delbrook Senior Secondary School

References

External links
 

Canadian women curlers
World curling champions
Curling broadcasters
Curlers from Vancouver
Living people
1954 births
Canadian women's curling champions
Medalists at the 1988 Winter Olympics
Olympic gold medalists for Canada